Novatorskaya is a metro station on Bolshaya Koltsevaya line of the Moscow Metro, between Prospekt Vernadskogo and Vorontsovskaya. The name of the station derives from Novatorov Street as it is located at the interchange between Leninsky Avenue and Novatorov Street. The station was opened on 7 December 2021 as part of the section between Mnyovniki and Kakhovskaya.

In 2024, a transfer to Novatorskaya of Troitskaya line is planned to open.

References

Moscow Metro stations
Railway stations in Russia opened in 2021
Bolshaya Koltsevaya line
Railway stations located underground in Russia